Kurt Erich Schork (January 24, 1947 – May 24, 2000) was an American reporter and war correspondent. He was killed in an ambush while on an assignment for Reuters in Sierra Leone together with cameraman Miguel Gil Moreno de Mora of Spain, who worked for Associated Press Television. Two other Reuters journalists, South African cameraman Mark Chisholm and Greek photographer Yannis Behrakis, were also injured in the attack.

Career
Kurt Schork was born Jan 25, 1947 in Washington, D.C. He graduated from Jamestown College in 1969, and studied at Oxford University as a Rhodes scholar later that year—the same time as future United States President Bill Clinton. Schork worked as a property developer, a political adviser, and then chief of staff for the New York City Transit Authority before becoming a journalist.

Kurt Schork covered numerous conflicts and wars, including The Balkans,  and in Iraq, Chechnya, Iraqi Kurdistan, Sri Lanka, and East Timor.

He filed the story Romeo and Juliet in Sarajevo, about a young couple, Boško Brkić and Admira Ismić, an Eastern Orthodox Bosnian Serb and Muslim Bosniak girl killed during the Siege of Sarajevo. Admira's and Boško's relationship defied the ethnic hatred which followed the breakup of the former Yugoslavia. After being shot and killed by a sniper while attempting to flee the area, their bodies remained unreachable on a bridge in no man's land for eight days as the war raged on. They became known as Romeo and Juliet as the story of their unshakable love emerged. Before they made the decision to flee, the young couple were serving as surrogate parents to the young sons of Admira's cousin, Brana, who was killed in Sarajevo by a 60-millimeter shell while putting her sons to sleep. Boško's decision to flee with Admira was influenced by the fact that his grandfather was summoned in Croatia to a police station by pro-Hitler Fascists during World War II and never seen again.

Kurt Schork Dispatch From Sarajevo

The original dispatch by Kurt Schork telling the moving story of Romeo and Juliet in Sarajevo.

After Schork died, as per his personal wishes, upon cremation half of his ashes was buried next to his mother in Washington, D.C., and half at "Groblje Lav" (The Lion Cemetery) in Sarajevo, next to the grave of Boško and Admira, the central figures in Schork's acclaimed story.

Mr. Schork has been memorialized posthumously in: the dedication of Kurt Schork Street in Sarajevo, and citizenship of Bosnia and Herzegovina: in the dedication of the Kurt Schork newsroom at Jamestown College, his alma mater; and in the documentary Romeo and Juliet in Sarajevo.

Kurt Schork Memorial Fund and Awards
The goal of the Kurt Schork Memorial Fund and Awards recognizes and assists freelance journalists, local journalists and news fixers who make a critical contribution to international understanding but whose work is often overlooked. The awards include three cash prizes of $5,000 each to provide some financial support to help the winners continue reporting. Though local journalists in the developing world take extraordinary risks to expose corruption and injustice in their countries, they rarely earn enough money to support themselves and their families. Similarly, freelancers live from job to job, never knowing when the next assignment will come, where it may lead or how long it will last. The News Fixer Award, newly introduced in 2017, aims to recognise the rarely credited yet often at-risk individuals who typically act as the correspondent’s eyes and ears on the ground. It is the fixers’ local knowledge, as well as their network of official – and unofficial – contacts that helps to secure critical interviews and access to all important areas for the out-of-town correspondents. The prize was inspired by the freelance journalist, author and friend of Kurt Schork, Anna Husarska, and pays tribute to the vital role that these unsung heroes play in coverage from difficult, dangerous and hostile locations. With these awards, the Fund spotlights the plight and achievements of freelance journalists, local reporters and news fixers.

References

External links
 Kurt Schork Memorial
 Kurt Schork’s signature dispatch from siege of Sarajevo
 Kurt Schork Memorial Fund
 Road to "Sniper Alley" in Sarajevo named for Reuters reporter
 Sierra Leone dangerous for journalists
 Original report on Schork's death - IFEX
 

1947 births
2000 deaths
American male journalists
American Rhodes Scholars
Reuters people
Deaths by firearm in Sierra Leone
Journalists killed while covering the Sierra Leone Civil War
American war correspondents
War correspondents of the Yugoslav Wars
Journalists from Washington, D.C.
University of Jamestown alumni